"Wild Wild West" is a song by American rapper and actor Will Smith from the 1999 film of the same name, in which he also starred. The song plays during the film's closing credits. The single samples Stevie Wonder's 1976 hit song "I Wish" and includes parts of the chorus from Kool Moe Dee's song of the same name. Kool Moe Dee re-performed the chorus for the song, and additional guest vocals are provided by Dru Hill. The album version of the song is introduced by a brief spoken-word interlude where Smith asks his infant son Jaden what song he should play next, interpreting Jaden's repeated non-verbal response as "Wild Wild West".

"Wild Wild West" was released on May 11, 1999, as a single from the film's soundtrack and as the lead single from Smith's second studio album, Willennium (1999). The song became a number-one hit on the US Billboard Hot 100, and its extended music video, directed by Paul Hunter, features Wonder and several other celebrities as guest stars. The song was nominated for a Blockbuster Entertainment Award for Favorite Song from a Movie and was the recipient of the 1999 Golden Raspberry Award for Worst Original Song.

Music video
Directed by Paul Hunter, the music video includes several dialog sequences featuring Smith, Kool Moe Dee, Dru Hill, and a guest appearance by Stevie Wonder, intercut with clips from the film, featuring the film's characters. Salma Hayek also appears as her character Rita Escobar in the video's dialog sequences, as does an actor resembling Kenneth Branagh and his character of Dr. Loveless. Latin pop star Enrique Iglesias also appeared in the video playing a Prince. The Fresh Prince of Bel-Air co-star and tap dancer Alfonso Ribeiro appeared in the music video as one of the dancers. Other cameos include actor Larenz Tate, Shari Headley, singer/writer/producer Babyface and female rapper MC Lyte.

Track listings

US CD and cassette single
 "Wild Wild West" – 4:05
 "Y'all Know" – 3:57

Australian and Japanese CD single
 "Wild Wild West" – 4:05
 "Wild Wild West" (radio version) – 3:29
 "Wild Wild West" (a cappella) – 4:05
 "Miami" (Miami Mix) – 4:40
 "Just the Two of Us" (Rodney Jerkins remix featuring Brian McKnight) – 4:14

European CD single
 "Wild Wild West" – 4:08
 "Wild Wild West" (instrumental) – 4:08

UK CD1
 "Wild Wild West" – 4:05
 "Gettin' Jiggy wit It" – 3:48
 "Big Willie Style" (featuring Left Eye) – 3:35

UK CD2
 "Wild Wild West" – 4:05
 "Miami" (Jason Nevins' Live on South Beach dub) – 5:10
 "Chasing Forever" – 4:16

UK cassette single
 "Wild Wild West" – 4:05
 "Big Willie Style" (featuring Left Eye) – 3:35

Charts

Weekly charts

Year-end charts

Certifications

Release history

In popular culture
 The song is featured as a playable song in Just Dance 4. If the song is completed on the Extreme Version with 5 stars players receive the "New Sheriff in Town" achievement.
 OutsideXbox's Andy Farrant is known for having memorized the song and rapping portions of it during the Oxventure Dungeon & Dragon's campaign quest Wild Wild Woods.

References

Film theme songs
1998 songs
1999 singles
Billboard Hot 100 number-one singles
Columbia Records singles
European Hot 100 Singles number-one singles
Music videos directed by Paul Hunter (director)
Songs written by Rob Fusari
Songs written by Stevie Wonder
Songs written by Will Smith
Songs written for films
Will Smith songs